Yair Lemos (born December 2, 1986 in Santana do Livramento, Brazil) is a Brazilian footballer currently playing for Cerrito of the Uruguayan Primera División.

Teams
  Central Español 2008
  El Tanque Sisley 2009-2010
  Cerrito 2010–present

External links
 
 Profile at Tenfield Digital Profile at

1986 births
Living people
Brazilian footballers
Brazilian expatriate footballers
Central Español players
El Tanque Sisley players
Sportivo Cerrito players
Expatriate footballers in Uruguay
Association football goalkeepers